Shikarpur is a village in Jaunpur tehsil of Jaunpur district, in the Varanasi division of the Indian state of Uttar Pradesh. According to the 2011 census, the population was 2,090.

References

Villages in Jaunpur district